Carl Lester Peterson (June 27, 1908 – May 30, 1989) played four seasons in the National Football League. He played at the collegiate level at the University of Texas at Austin. He attended Taylor High School.

References

Portsmouth Spartans players
Green Bay Packers players
Staten Island Stapletons players
Brooklyn Dodgers (NFL) players
Texas Longhorns football players
1908 births
1989 deaths